The 2022 Bass Pro Shops Night Race was a NASCAR Cup Series race held on September 17, 2022 at Bristol Motor Speedway in Bristol, Tennessee. Contested over 500 laps on the  short track, it was the 29th race of the 2022 NASCAR Cup Series season, third race of the Playoffs and final race of the Round of 16. Chris Buescher of RFK Racing would win the race, while Tyler Reddick, Kyle Busch, Austin Dillon, and Kevin Harvick would be eliminated from the playoffs.

Report

Background

The Bristol Motor Speedway, formerly known as Bristol International Raceway and Bristol Raceway, is a NASCAR short track venue located in Bristol, Tennessee. Constructed in 1960, it held its first NASCAR race on July 30, 1961. Despite its short length, Bristol is among the most popular tracks on the NASCAR schedule because of its distinct features, which include extraordinarily steep banking, an all concrete surface, two pit roads, and stadium-like seating. It has also been named one of the loudest NASCAR tracks.

Entry list
 (R) denotes rookie driver.
 (i) denotes driver who is ineligible for series driver points.

Practice

Practice results

Qualifying

Qualifying results

Race

Stage Results

Stage One
Laps: 125

Stage Two
Laps: 125

Final Stage Results

Stage Three
Laps: 250

Race statistics
 Lead changes: 12 among 6 different drivers
 Cautions/Laps: 11 for 80
 Red flags: 0
 Time of race: 3 hours, 1 minute and 7 seconds
 Average speed:

Media

Television
USA covered the race on the television side. Rick Allen, 2008 Food City 500 winner Jeff Burton, Steve Letarte and Dale Earnhardt Jr. called the race from the broadcast booth. Dave Burns, Kim Coon, Marty Snider, and Dillon Welch handled the pit road duties from pit lane.

Radio
PRN had the radio call for the race, which was also simulcast on Sirius XM NASCAR Radio. Doug Rice and Mark Garrow called the race from the booth when the field races down the frontstretch. Rob Albright called the race when the field races down the backstretch. Brad Gillie, Brett McMillan, Alan Cavanna, and Wendy Venturini handled the duties on pit lane.

Standings after the race

Drivers' Championship standings

Manufacturers' Championship standings

Note: Only the first 16 positions are included for the driver standings.

References

Bass Pro Shops NRA Night Race
Bass Pro Shops NRA Night Race
Bass Pro Shops NRA Night Race
NASCAR races at Bristol Motor Speedway